Bill McPherson (1897–1976) was a Scottish-American soccer player.

Bill McPherson may also refer to:
Bill McPherson (American football) (1931–2020), American football coach
Bill McPherson (footballer), Scottish footballer for Liverpool F.C.

See also
William McPherson (disambiguation)